Euchlorostola interrupta is a moth of the subfamily Arctiinae. It was described by Francis Walker in 1856. It is found in Mexico.

References

 

Arctiinae
Moths described in 1856